End of Me may refer to:

 "End of Me" (Marion Raven song), 2005
 "End of Me" (Apocalyptica song), 2010
 "End of Me" (A Day to Remember song), 2013
 "End of Me", a song by Ashes Remain from the album What I've Become
 "End of Me", a song by Billy Talent from the album Crisis of Faith